Hræsvelgr is a jötunn in Norse mythology. He is portrayed as the eagle-shaped originator of the wind.

Name
The Old Norse name Hræsvelgr has been translated as 'corpse-swallower', or as 'shipwreck-current'.

Hræsvelgr's name is sometimes anglicised as Hraesvelgr, Hresvelgr, Hraesveglur, or Hraesvelg. The common Danish form is Hræsvælg and the common Swedish form is Räsvelg.

Attestation
In Vafþrúðnismál (The Lay of Vafþrúðnir), Odin questions the wise jötunn Vafþrúðnir about the origin of the wind, and the jötunn answer:

This stanza is paraphrased by Snorri Sturluson in Gylfaginning (The Beguiling of Gylfi), when Hárr answers the same question, that time asked by Gangleri (Gylfi in disguise). Snorri adds that Hræsvelgr sits at the north end of heaven, and that winds originate from under his gigantic eagle’s wings when he spreads them for flight.

References

Bibliography

Further reading
Jón Hnefill Aðalsteinsson (1998). "Hræsvelgr, the Wind-Giant, Reinterpreted" in A Piece of Horse Liver: Myth, Ritual and Folklore in Old Icelandic Sources. .

Birds in Norse mythology
Jötnar
Mythological birds of prey
Wind gods